Boğazpınar can refer to the following villages in Turkey:

 Boğazpınar, Manyas
 Boğazpınar, Tarsus